Bloom is a generative music application for iOS created by Brian Eno and Peter Chilvers. The software plays a low drone, and touching the screen produces different tones, which play in a loop. If the screen is left untouched, the software will create its own music.

Eno and Chilvers have since released a related app named trope and another in 2012 named Scape.

References

External links
 generativemusic.com

2008 software
Brian Eno
Computer music software
IOS software